Giannis Liourdis (born 27 February 1979) is a Greek former professional footballer who played as a goalkeeper.

Liourdis previously played in the Greek Super League with Paniliakos F.C.

References

External links
Myplayer.gr Profile
Onsports.gr Profile
Profile at epae.org

1979 births
Living people
Greek footballers
Greece under-21 international footballers
Super League Greece players
Paniliakos F.C. players
Panetolikos F.C. players
Ethnikos Asteras F.C. players
Panachaiki F.C. players
Association football goalkeepers
Footballers from Patras